Herbert Norman Lambert (29 January 1900 – 19 July 1984) was a cricketer who played first-class cricket for Wellington from 1917 to 1933. He played twice for New Zealand in the days before New Zealand played Test cricket.

Cricket career
Lambert was an all-rounder, a batsman who could open the batting or bat in the middle order, and a bowler of off-spin. His highest first-class score was 107, the only century in a low-scoring match that Wellington won to clinch the Plunket Shield in 1931-32. His best bowling figures were 6 for 102 in Wellington's 19-run victory over Canterbury in 1929-30. 

Lambert's first-class cricket career was interrupted by periods of living outside Wellington. However, in 1922-23, while living in Taranaki, he showed such good form for a combined Taranaki and Wanganui team against the touring MCC team – scoring 66 (in 52 minutes) and 63 in the two-day match when nobody else in the team exceeded 37, – that he was selected to play in the last two of New Zealand's three matches against the MCC. He scored 114 runs in the two matches at an average of 38.00 to lead New Zealand's batting averages. However, his only subsequent appearance for New Zealand was as twelfth man in the Second Test against South Africa in 1931–32. He was the leading scorer in Wellington senior club cricket that season, with 716 runs at an average of 65.09, as well as 35 wickets at 20.51.

In late 1932 Lambert was engaged by the Hastings sub-association of the Hawke's Bay Cricket Association as a coach. He remained there for several seasons, playing occasionally for the Hawke's Bay representative team, which he captained and managed for a Hawke Cup challenge in 1936-37.

References

External links

1900 births
1984 deaths
New Zealand cricketers
New Zealand cricket coaches
Pre-1930 New Zealand representative cricketers
Wellington cricketers
People from Wellington City
North Island cricketers